Lloyd Duffy (born December 8, 1944) is a Canadian retired Champion jockey in Thoroughbred flat horse racing who uniquely is also a licensed driver of harness racing horses.

As a teenager, Duff began attending harness racing events at a racetrack near his home. He left school to go to work for a local stable and eventually made his way to Toronto, Ontario where he was introduced to Thoroughbred racing. Having the physique necessary to be a jockey, he learned to ride and in 1966 obtained his jockey license. While he started his new career slowly, after earning his first win on June 29, 1967 he soon became one of the top apprentice jockeys on the Ontario circuit.

Duffy enjoyed an outstanding career in Canadian racing. Frequently among the top jockeys in wins during the 1970s and 1980s at Greenwood Raceway, and at Woodbine and Fort Erie Racetracks, he also traveled to compete around the world.

Notable among the horses Duffy rode were two Hall of Fame inductees. In 1981 he rode Deputy Minister who was voted the Canadian and American Champion Two-Year-Old Colt as well as Canadian Horse of the Year. The following year he was voted the Sovereign Award for Outstanding Jockey when he was the regular jockey for Canadian Horse of the Year, Frost King.

In 1982, Duffy was inducted in the PEI Sports Hall of Fame and in 1990 he was voted the Avelino Gomez Memorial Award, an honour given annually to a jockey in Canada who has made significant contributions to the sport.

Retired after thirty years as a jockey, on October 17, 1998, in an event that raised money for charity at the racetrack in his native Charlottetown, Duffy was the celebrity guest jockey who rode in a "man vs horse" match race against sprinter Ben Johnson.

Duffy continues to work in the horse racing industry, exercising horses for various racing stables at Woodbine Racetrack.

References

 April 6, 2005 CBC documentary film No Glory

1944 births
Living people
Avelino Gomez Memorial Award winners
Canadian harness racing drivers
Canadian jockeys
Sovereign Award winners
Sportspeople from Charlottetown